Roger E. Barrus (born 4 October 1949) is a Republican member of the Utah State House of Representatives representing central Davis County, Utah.

Early life and career
Barrus was born October 4, 1949 in Blackfoot, Idaho. He received his B.S. in Engineering at Utah State University and worked as an environment and safety engineer until he retired. He currently lives in Centerville, UT with his wife Laurel and four children. Barrus is a member of the Church of Jesus Christ of Latter-day Saints.

Political career
Barrus was elected to the Utah House of Representatives for District 18 in 2000 and has served continuously since then. In 2012 he was re-elected after beating his Democratic opponent Doug Macdonald with 74.3% of the vote.

During the 2014 General Session he served on the House Ethics Committee, the House Natural Resources, Agriculture and Environment Committee and the House Public Utilities and Technology Committee.

2014 Sponsored Legislation

Representative Barrus also floor sponsored SB0242 Alternative Energy Amendments.

References

External links

1949 births
Latter Day Saints from Idaho
Utah State University alumni
People from Centerville, Utah
Republican Party members of the Utah House of Representatives
Living people
21st-century American politicians
Latter Day Saints from Utah
People from Blackfoot, Idaho